The Sheboygan Red Skins (or Redskins) was a professional basketball team based in Sheboygan, Wisconsin, which was an original National Basketball Association franchise during the 1949–1950 season.

History

Overview
The Redskins played in three professional leagues and as an independent team. The leagues were, in order, the National Basketball League (NBL); the National Basketball Association (charter member), and the National Professional Basketball League (NPBL).

The team originated in 1933 from informal clubs which were sponsored by local businesses. They joined the NBL by 1938 as the Red Skins, owned by a syndicate. The Red Skins played in the NBL from 1938 to 1949, led the league in defense five times, appeared in five championship series and won the 1942–43 title, defeating the league-leading Fort Wayne Zollner Pistons (today's Detroit Pistons) in the finals.

They were undone by the 1949 merger of the NBL and the BAA. The other league which merged to form the NBA (the Basketball Association of America) had more money, played in larger cities, and generally fielded better teams.

The Red Skins were one of seven franchises which quickly left the NBA. The league contracted after the 1949–1950 season, losing six teams; the Anderson Packers, Sheboygan Red Skins and Waterloo Hawks jumped to the NPBL, and the Chicago Stags, Denver Nuggets and St. Louis Bombers folded. The NBA shrank from 17 teams to 11 before the 1950–1951 season began. The Washington Capitols folded midway through the season, reducing the number of teams in the league to ten.

The Red Skins did not fit well, left the league, and joined the short-lived NPBL. When that league folded, the team returned to its independent roots for one more year of play before it also disappeared.

Early years 
The team formed in Sheboygan as the Ballhorns in 1933. Sponsors changed every couple of years, and the team changed its name to match its current sponsor. Successful playing regional rivals and distant touring teams, they were invited to join the fledgling NBL in 1938. Now a full-time professional organization with an extensive traveling schedule, it took more than one local business to support the team. A syndicate of Sheboygan community members incorporated the team as the Red Skins, and they gradually became successful.

Barnstorming roots 
Before joining the NBL, Sheboygan had developed a reputation in the Midwest during the early 1930s for successful industrial-league and barnstorming teams. The Ballhorns, sponsored by a local furniture store and funeral parlor, began in 1933; local tailor and dry cleaner Art Imig took over in 1935, and gelatin producer Enzo-Pac sponsored the team two years later.

Brothers Johnny and Joe "Scoop" Posewitz, Les Kuplic, Slim Lonsdorf, Carl Roth, Pete and Dugan Norris, and John Cinealis were among the better Sheboygan players during the decade. The  Jack Mann, one of the first outstanding Black players in the game, starred at center during the 1936–37 season. In 1937–38, they had a 17–3 record against teams such as the New York Renaissance, Harlem Globetrotters, New York Celtics and Chicago Duffy Florals.

The team had a friendly rivalry with the Oshkosh All-Stars. The All-Stars' founder and president was Lon Darling, who helped found the NBL in 1937 and became league president the following year.

Transition to professional team 
After the successful 1937–38 season, the Enzo Jels were admitted to the NBL on June 11, 1938 at the league meeting in Oshkosh, Wisconsin with help from Darling. They were soon taken over by a group of local business leaders and renamed the Red Skins. Their first coach was Edwin "Doc" Schutte, a local dentist.

After compiling an 11–17 record in his only season, Schutte stepped down to devote more time to his practice. The Red Skins were consistent winners under attorney and coach Frank Zummach from 1939 to 1942, including a spot opposite the Oshkosh All-Stars in the 1941 NBL finals. Zummach (an assistant coach at Marquette University for six seasons) formed his team around Marquette alumni, including All-American Dave Quabius, Glenn R. "Sparky" Adams, George Hesik, Bill McDonald and Paul Sokody. Sandlotter Otto Kolar, from Cicero, Illinois, was rated one of the Midwest's best guards and ran the Red Skins offense.

Arenas 

The Red Skins left the 1,500-seat Eagles Auditorium in downtown Sheboygan in late 1942 and moved into the 3,500-seat Sheboygan Municipal Auditorium and Armory, five blocks away near Lake Michigan. The Eagles Auditorium, part of the Playdium building, was destroyed by fire in 1977.

Known as "the Armory," the armory was a WPA project and contained the NBL's largest floor at the time: . It was added to Wisconsin's register of historic places in 2019.

Middle years

NBL title 
The Red Skins reached their zenith in 1942–43 under coach Carl Roth, who had played for Sheboygan's industrial-league powerhouses during the 1930s and on the first Red Skins team in 1938–39. The late-season acquisition of Hall of Fame guard Buddy Jeannette, who joined Sheboygan for their last four regular-season games and the playoffs and commuted from his home in Rochester, New York, was a significant factor in the team's 1943 NBL title. Jeannette, who worked at a Rochester defense plant and traveled to Sheboygan games primarily on weekends, averaged 15.5 points per game when final scores hovered in the 30s and 40s. Other major contributors to Sheboygan's championship team were NBL rookie of the year Ken Buehler, all-league players Ed Dancker and Ken Suesens, and shooter Rube Lautenschlager. The team received the inaugural Naismith Memorial Trophy.

Continued success 
After winning their only NBL title, the Red Skins continued to be one of the strongest teams in professional basketball and appeared in the next three championship series (1944, 1945 and 1946) behind Mike Novaka  former All-American from Loyolaand Dancker: a  player who honed his skills in the Milwaukee recreational leagues. Suesens, Lautenschlager, Dick Schulz, Tony Kelly, Al Lucas, Al Moschetti and Bobby Holm were other key Red Skins during this period. The signing of Lucas, Moschetti and Holm by Basketball Hall of Famer Dutch Dehnert in 1944 was the team's first acquisition of a group of name players from the East Coast.

Sheboygan lost in the finals to Fort Wayne in 1944 and 1945, the latter after a 2–0 lead in the best-of-five series. They lost in 1946 to the powerhouse Rochester Royals, who had Hall of Famers Al Cervi, Bob Davies and Red Holzman. Dehnert coached the Red Skins to consecutive divisional titles, leaving after the 1945–46 season to coach the Cleveland Rebels of the Basketball Association of America.

Sheboygan remained among the NBL's elite teams, securing playoff berths in 1947 and 1949. Before the 1946–47 season, the Red Skins were the first NBL team to fly to the West Coast. They played at Los Angeles' Grand Olympic Auditorium and lost two close games to the Los Angeles Red Devils, whose best player was UCLA alumnus Jackie Robinson; the following spring, Robinson broke baseball's color barrier. Sheboygan finished the season with a 26–18 record (two games behind first-place Oshkosh in the Western Division), but the Red Skins lost to the All-Stars 49–47 in the fifthand decidinggame of their first-round playoff.

Rebuilding 
For about a month in December 1947, Hall of Fame player Bobby McDermott was a player-coach for the Red Skins. He was obtained from the Chicago American Gears after the Professional Basketball League of America folded the previous month. McDermott played in 16 games for Sheboygan, scoring 138 points. As coach, he took the reins from Doxie Moore and had a 4–5 record. Moore resumed coaching Sheboygan after McDermott left to join the Tri-Cities Blackhawks in January 1948. The season was one of the Red Skins' most disappointing; the team was aging and in disarray, with a 23–37 record.

In 1948–49 (the NBL's last season) the Red Skins unveiled a fresh group of stars, including Kentucky All-American Bob Brannum, Valparaiso star Milt Schoon, Texas guard Danny Wagner, Washington guard Merlin "Boody" Gilbertson, Iowa center Noble Jorgensen and Wisconsin guard Bobby Cook. With holdovers Mike Todorovich (a first-team NBL pick in 1947–48), Wisconsin forward Paul Cloyd, University of Toledo guard Bob Bolyard, Northwestern football and basketball All-American Max Morris and player-coach Suesens (who had starred at Iowa, where he roomed with Heisman Trophy winner Nile Kinnick), the Red Skins finished their 11th season in the NBL with a 35–29 record.

Only the Oshkosh All-Stars appeared in more NBL championship series (six) than Sheboygan, or played more seasons in the league (12). The Red Skins made the NBL playoffs eight times and were invited to appear in nearly every prestigious World Pro Tournament held in Chicago. Their best finish in Chicago was in 1939, when they lost the consolation championship to the Harlem Globetrotters.

Final years 
After the 1948–1949 season, the team went into decline due to changes in professional basketball. Although the rival BAA had formed a few years earlier and the leagues saw an opportunity to expand the game's appeal through a merger, many NBL teams could not compete at the BAA level; they did not have corporate money or a big-city fan base. The mismatch drove many former NBL teams to leave after one season, including the Red Skins.

Those teams attempted to recover by forming a new league, but it also only lasted one season. The Red Skins tried to continue, but failed to form another new league and closed after an independent run during the 1951–1952 season.

NBA charter member 
On August 3, 1949, Sheboygan and six other NBL teams merged with the 10-team BAA to become the National Basketball Association. The Red Skins, who played in the NBA's smallest arena (and market), competed in the 1949–50 season with Suesens as coach and finished with a 22–40 record: fourth place in the six-team Western Division. When Oshkosh folded soon after the merger, Sheboygan became the country's oldest professional basketball franchise. The Red Skins had a 7–2 start with home victories against the Boston Celtics, New York Knicks, Rochester Royals, and Indianapolis Olympians.

The most spectacular win of the 1949–50 season was on January 5, 1950, when they defeated George Mikan and the Minneapolis Lakers 85–82 in front of a standing-room-only crowd of 3,800 fans at the Armory. Four future Hall of Famers were on the floor for Minneapolis that Thursday night: Mikan (who scored 42 points), Jim Pollard, Vern Mikkelsen and Slater Martin. The Lakers' coach was Hall of Famer John Kundla. The victory against that season's eventual NBA champion gave the Red Skins a 13–13 record, after which injuries took their toll and the team faded. They qualified for the playoffs, however, where they nearly upset the Western Division champion Indianapolis Olympians in a best-of-three series.

National Professional Basketball League 
The team was unwelcome in the NBA during their first season. Ned Irish, president of the New York Knicks, refused to participate in the same league as the "bush leagues": small-city charter NBA teams from the NBL, such as the Red Skins, Waterloo Hawks and Anderson Packers. Sheboygan withdrew from the NBA on April 24, 1950, and joined the new National Professional Basketball League with several other NBA teams.

The NPBL formed around the former NBL/NBA teams, with larger-market teams added. The charter teams were the East Division Red Skins, Anderson Packers, Louisville Alumnites and Grand Rapids Hornets, and the West Division Denver Refiners/Evansville Agogans,  Saint Paul Lights, Kansas City Hi-Spots and Waterloo Hawks. Sheboygan posted the NPBL's best record (29–16) in 1950–51. Sheboygan and Waterloo finished first in their respective divisions, but the league did not conduct a playoff and dissolved at the end of the regular season. Both teams claimed the championship, based on division play.

Attempt to survive 
In summer 1951, longtime Red Skins president Magnus Brinkman led a drive to form a league which would have been called the Western Basketball Association, consisting of eight to 10 teams and seeking two other NBA castoffs: the Waterloo Hawks and the Anderson Packers. Competition from the NBA became too great, however, and the effort failed.

The Red Skins played one season of independent basketball, in 1951–52, before dissolving. Bobby Cook, who had scored an NBA-record 44 points in a Red Skins home game against the Denver Nuggets in January 1950, coached the team. The final Sheboygan Red Skins team consisted of several former University of Wisconsin players and compiled a winning record, primarily playing other independent Midwest teams. Attendance was low, however, and the team discontinued operations after losing its final game to the College All-Stars at the Armory.

Notable alumni 

 Bob Bolyard
 Bob Brannum
 Ken Buehler
 Jack Burmaster
 Paul Cloyd
 Bobby Cook
 Ed Dancker
 Merlin "Boody" Gilbertson
 John Givens
 Luther Harris
 George Hesik
 Bobby Holm
 Noble Jorgensen
 Tony Kelly
 Otto Kolar
 John Kotz
 Les Kuplic
 Walt Lautenbach
 Rube Lautenschlager
 Fred B. Lewis
 Slim Lonsdorf
 Al Lucas
 Bill McDonald
 Max Morris
 Al Moschetti
 Mike Novak
 Wally Osterkorn
 Jack Phelan
 Joe "Scoop" Posewitz
 Johnny Posewitz
 Dave Quabius
 Carl Roth
 Milt Schoon
 Paul Sokody
 Kenny Suesens
 Mike Todorovich
 Danny Wagner

Naismith Basketball Hall of Fame

Head coaches 
 Edwin "Doc" Schutte, 1938–39
 Frank Zummach, 1939–1942
 Carl Roth, 1942–1944
 Henry "Dutch" Dehnert, 1944–1946
 Doxie Moore, 1946–1948
 Bobby McDermott, 1947–48 (player-coach)
 Ken Suesens, 1948–1951 (player-coach in 1948–49)
 Bobby Cook, 1951–52 (player-coach)

Season-by-season records 

|-
!colspan="6"|Sheboygan Red Skins (NBL)
|-
|1938–39 ||11||17||0.393|| ||
|-
|1939–40 ||15||13||0.536||1–2||Lost Western Division finals
|-
|1940–41 ||13||11||0.542||2–4||Lost NBL finals
|-
|1941–42 ||10||14||0.417|| ||
|-
|1942–43 ||12||11||0.522||4–1||NBL champions
|-
|1943–44 ||14||8||0.636||2–4||Lost NBL finals
|-
|1944–45 ||19||11||0.633||4–4||Lost NBL finals
|-
|1945–46 ||21||13||0.618||3–5||Lost NBL finals
|-
|1946–47 ||26||18||0.591||2–3||Lost Western Division semifinals
|-
|1947–48 ||23||37||0.383|| || 
|-
|1948–49 ||35||29||0.547||0–2||Lost Western Division semifinals
|-
!colspan="6"|Sheboygan Red Skins (NBA)
|-
|1949–50 ||22||40||0.355||1–2||Lost Western Division semifinals
|-
!colspan="6"|Sheboygan Red Skins (NPBL)
|-
|1950–51 ||29||16||0.644|| ||Top mark when league dissolved
|-

References

Further reading

External links 
Complete Sheboygan Redskins History

 
1938 establishments in Wisconsin
1952 disestablishments in Wisconsin
Basketball teams established in 1938
Basketball teams disestablished in 1952
Defunct National Basketball Association teams
National Professional Basketball League (1950–51)
Sheboygan, Wisconsin